The Hôtel de Simiane (a.k.a. "Hôtel de Grignan Simiane") is a listed hôtel particulier in Aix-en-Provence.

Location
It is located at number 17 on the Rue Goyrand in the Quartier Mazarin of Aix-en-Provence.

History
It was designed by architect Thomas Lainée (1682-1739) in the seventeenth century. It includes wallpapers by Claude-Joseph Vernet (1714–1789). It has three stories. Outside, it has a fountain with a fountain.

It was the private residence of Françoise-Marguerite de Sévigné (1646–1705) and her husband François Adhémar de Monteil, Comte de Grignan (1632–1714). Their daughter, Pauline de Simiane (1676-1737), sold it to another private owner in 1730.

Heritage significance
It has been listed as a monument historique since 1 July 1989.

References

Hôtels particuliers in Aix-en-Provence
Monuments historiques of Aix-en-Provence